Matías Fabián Tapia (born 26 January 1996) is an Argentine former professional footballer who played as a centre-back.

Playing career
Tapia is a product of Barracas Central's youth ranks. Salvador Daniele selected Tapia for his professional debut on 22 February 2019, as the defender came off the substitutes bench in a 6–0 victory over Comunicaciones in Primera B Metropolitana; as he played alongside his brother. Another appearance came two months later in the Copa Argentina against Unión Santa Fe. They won promotion at the end of his first season. On 5 December 2019, a 23-year old Tapia announced his retirement from professional football after just five senior appearances.

Post-playing career
In March 2020, Tapia became president of Barracas Central; aged 24.

Personal life
Tapia's brother, Iván, also plays football professionally. They are the sons of Claudio Tapia and grandsons of Hugo Moyano. Their cousin, Facundo Moyano, is also a footballer.

Career statistics
.

Honours
Barracas Central
Primera B Metropolitana: 2018–19

References

External links

1996 births
Living people
Tapia family
Footballers from Buenos Aires
Argentine footballers
Association football defenders
Primera B Metropolitana players
Primera Nacional players
Barracas Central players